Orontes IV (Old Persian: *Arvanta-) was the son of King Arsames and is recorded as ruling Armenia from inscriptions found at the historic capital of the Orontid dynasty, Armavir. He was the founder of the city of Yervandashat.
In his reign the religious site of Bagaran was founded. Large bronze statues in the Hellenistic style of the gods, Zeus (Aramazd), Artemis (Anahit) and Herakles (Vahagn) were brought there and set up in temples dedicated to them. He is also said to have founded a shrine at Armavir dedicated to Apollo (Mithra), a golden statue of four horses pulling a chariot with Apollo as god of the Sun. This was later destroyed by the Sassanid Persian army in the 4th century AD.

King Antiochus III instigated a revolt against King Orontes IV. Strabo, who wrote about this 200 years later, stated that it was general Artaxias I, who was also an Orontid, who overthrew King Orontes IV. Aramaic inscriptions found at Armavir state that King Orontes IV died at the hands of his own army, in other words by betrayal from Artaxias I. This was most likely bribery  of the Armenian army by King Antiochus III.

Artaxias I took over as King of Armenia soon afterwards, according to Strabo.
Orontes IV  had a son, Ptolemaeus of Commagene, who served as the last  Satrap of Commagene between 201–163 BC, became in 163 BC the first King of Commagene and died in 130 BC.

Ancestry

References 
 J. M. Cook
 Richard G. Hovannisian

Sources 
 
 

3rd-century BC kings of Armenia
2nd-century BC kings of Armenia
Orontid dynasty
3rd-century BC births
Year of birth unknown
200 BC deaths